The Durian Tunggal Reservoir is a reservoir in Alor Gajah District, Melaka, Malaysia. It is one of the main source of water supply to residents in Melaka.

History
In early 1991, the reservoir dried up, affecting more than 600,000 people. The problem continued until early 1992. In 1993, to overcome this problem, the Malacca State Government signed a water supply agreement with Johor State Government.

Geology
The inflow to the reservoir is Melaka River.

Facilities
The reservoir features camping area, jogging paths, merry-go-round, children's playground and refreshment kiosk. Various activities can be done at the reservoir, such as boating, fishing or windsurfing.

See also
 Geography of Malaysia
 List of tourist attractions in Melaka

References

Geography of Malacca
Reservoirs in Malaysia